Estonian Canadians are Canadian citizens or residents of Estonian descent or Estonian-born people who reside in Canada. Currently 24,530 people of Estonian descent live in Canada.(according to some sources up to 50,000 people).

In the late 1940s and early 1950s, about 17,000 arrived in Canada. The city with the largest population of Estonians outside Estonia is Toronto. The first Estonian World Festival was held in Toronto in 1972.

Some notable Estonian Canadians and Canadians with Estonian ethnicity include Kalle Lasn, Alison Pill, Uno Prii, Elmar Tampõld, Endel Tulving, and Andreas Vaikla.

References

External links
Estonians in Canada at eesti.ca
Toronto Estonian House
Estonian Central Council in Canada

Canadian
European Canadian
 Estonian Canadian